Josh Keyes (born 1969) is an American contemporary artist who makes paintings and prints. He is known for his "eco-surrealist" painting style and images of graffitied covered wilderness. He is based in Portland, Oregon and previously lived in Oakland, California.

Biography 
Josh Keyes was born on August 17, 1969 in Tacoma, Washington.

Keyes has a bachelor's degree (1992) from the School of the Art Institute of Chicago, and a master's degree (1998) in painting and printmaking from Yale University.

Work 
Keyes' work has been described as "a satirical look at the impact urban sprawl has on the environment and surmises, with the aid of scientific slices and core samples, what could happen if we continue to infiltrate and encroach on our rural surroundings."

His painting style often includes narrative and the illusion of constructed worlds. Keyes' style is reminiscent of the diagrammatic vocabulary found in scientific textbook illustrations that often express through a detached and clinical viewpoint an empirical representation of the natural world. Assembled into this virtual stage set are references to contemporary events along with images and themes from his personal mythology.

His work is a hybrid of eco-surrealism and dystopia that express a concern and anxiety for our time and the Earth's future.

Keyes' public mural Treadmill (2006), is painted on the side of the Locust Street Garage in Walnut Creek, California.

References

External links 
Official website
Facebook Official Page
Feature on Artistaday.com

Living people
1969 births
American illustrators
20th-century American painters
American male painters
21st-century American painters
21st-century American male artists
Artists from Washington (state)
American contemporary painters
Yale University alumni
School of the Art Institute of Chicago alumni
Artists from Portland, Oregon
20th-century American male artists